Norrköping Exhibition of Art and Industry was an exhibition in Norrköping, Sweden in 1906.

At the initiative of the local industrial association Norrköpings Fabriksförening och Handtverksförening it was decided an art and industrial exhibition should be held in Norrköping between June1September15, 1906. The exhibition was opened by the Crown Prince Gustaf and was mostly held at the area south of the Sylten neighbourhood. He also designed the Jaktpaviljongen (hunting pavilion).

Art exhibition 
The cultural parts of the 1906 exhibition attracted huge attention when over 900 pieces of art were shown in 15 different rooms. Artists included Anna Ancher, Michael Ancher, Ivar Arosenius, Oscar Björk, John Bauer, Prince Eugen, Peder Severin Krøyer, Carl Larsson, Birger Palme, Georg Pauli, Hanna Pauli, Georg von Rosen, David Wallin, Nabot Törnros and Anders Zorn.

Moa Martinson 
At the main restaurant Moa Martinson, who later became an author, worked as a pantry chef. Moa's Stairs with 80 steps are still visible. In her book Kungens rosor ("The King's Roses") Martinson tells about her work at the restaurant.

References

External links 

Swedish art
1906 in Sweden
Exhibitions in Sweden
Visual arts exhibitions
Norrköping